The Mandsaur- Meerut City Link Express is an Express train belonging to Western Railway zone that runs between  and  in India. It is currently being operated with 29019/29020 train numbers on a daily basis.

Service

The 29019/Mandsaur–Meerut City Link Express has an average speed of 46 km/hr and covers 805 km in 17h 25m. The 29020/Meerut City–Mandsaur Link Express has an average speed of 43 km/hr and covers 805 km in 18h 30m.

Route and halts 

The important halts of the train are:

 
Nimach

Coach composition

The train has standard ICF rakes with max speed of 110 kmph. The train consists of 6 coaches:

 1 AC II Tier and AC III Tier
 1 AC III Tier
 2 Sleeper coaches
 1 General Unreserved

Traction

Both trains are hauled by a Ratlam Loco Shed-based WDM-3A diesel locomotive from Mandsaur to Kota. From Kota trains are hauled by a Ghaziabad Loco Shed or Tuglakabad Loco Shed-based WAP-4E electric locomotive  until Meerut and vice versa.

Rake sharing

The train attached to 19019/19020 Bandra Terminus–Dehradun Express at Kota and run together between Kota and Meerut.

Direction reversal

The train reverses its direction 1 times:

See also 

 Mandsaur railway station
 Meerut City Junction railway station
 Bandra Terminus- Dehradun Express

Notes

References

External links 

 29019/Mandsaur–Meerut City Link Express India Rail Info
 29020/Meerut City–Mandsaur Link Express India Rail Info

Transport in Meerut
Express trains in India
Rail transport in Madhya Pradesh
Rail transport in Rajasthan
Rail transport in Haryana
Rail transport in Delhi
Rail transport in Uttar Pradesh
Mandsaur